The Pétrusse is a river flowing through Luxembourg, joining the Alzette at Luxembourg City.  It flows through the town of Hollerich.

Rivers of Luxembourg